Karl August Hindrey (15 August 1875 Abja Manor, Viljandi County – 9 January 1947) was an Estonian writer, journalist and cartoonist. He is mostly known through his psychological short stories and historical novels. He is also considered to be the founder of Estonian comics.

From 1904, he worked in the editorial offices of the newspapers Postimees and Päevaleht. He used the pseudonym Hoia Ronk, when he made contributions to the two newspapers mentioned above. He established two satirical magazines: Sädemed and Kratt.

During the Second World War, his activities were anti-Soviet. He was also one of the Forest Brothers.

He died in 1947. He is buried in Metsakalmistu Cemetery.

Works
 1906: comic book "Piripilli-Liisu" ('Betty Crybaby')
 1918: comic book "Lõhkiläinud Kolumats" ('Burst Kolumats the Bogeyman')
 1929: memoirs "Minu elukroonika" ('The chronicle of my life', 3 volumes)
 1937: novel "Sigtuna häving" ('The Destruction of Sigtuna')

References

External links

1875 births
1947 deaths
20th-century Estonian writers
Estonian children's writers
Estonian male novelists
Estonian male short story writers
Estonian humorists
Estonian caricaturists
Estonian journalists
People from Abja-Paluoja
Burials at Metsakalmistu